David Weston (1935–2011) was a British industrial artist and author.

Early life
David Weston was born in Belgrave, Leicester, in 1935 to an aircraft engineer father. He first worked as a draper, painting in his spare time. Weston's first gallery and workshop was in Leicester in the late 1960s, at the junction of Barkby Road and Fairfax Road. He supported his artistic work by offering a picture framing service.

Career
Weston made a living painting railway and industrial subjects. He was introduced to the subject by John Scholes (deceased) of the Clapham Museum and later the British Transport Museum. In the early 1970s he was commissioned to paint The Great Train Robbery Board Game Box by the Games inventor Bruce Barrymore Halpenny. He also painted landscapes, usually in acrylic on board. He made at least one painting of Ragdale Hall, which at that time was derelict just before being turned into a health spa. In the mid 1970s he was commissioned to paint a series of 24 large canvasses by Sir William McAlpine, on the history of the British steam locomotive. The project took three and a half years to complete, and was launched in 1977 at the Royal Exchange in London. The event was televised and attended by the Prince Philip, Duke of Edinburgh, who later invited Weston and McAlpine to meet with him at Buckingham Palace.

Weston became known as "the Railway Artist" in the 1980s after some of his paintings were accepted by the London Transport Museum. He was the subject of two television documentaries, including Beware of Trains which was broadcast in 1981.

Selected paintings from Weston's History of the Great British Steam Locomotive and Rolls-Royce Fantasia were reproduced as interval slides used by ITV Schools in 1981, 1985 and 1986. He was made an honorary Doctor of Letters (D.Litt.) by the University of Leicester in 2009.

Later years and death
He lived out his final years with his wife Mary at their home in Kirby Bellars, Leicestershire. He died age 75 on 10 May 2011 from the Idiopathic pulmonary fibrosis which had been diagnosed 15 years earlier, and had spent the last year of his life too ill to paint. His final exhibition was at his Kirby Bellars studio in October 2010, with all exhibited works sold.

Selected bibliography

References

External links
 David Weston at Art of Europe – site selling licensed prints of Weston's work

1935 births
2011 deaths
20th-century British painters
British male painters
21st-century British painters
Place of birth missing
People from Belgrave, Leicester
People from the Borough of Melton
20th-century British male artists
21st-century British male artists